Ugur Aktas  (born 3 October 1990) is a Turkish professional footballer who plays for Bugsaşspor in the TFF First League.

Club career

References

External links
 Profile
 

1990 births
Living people
Turkish footballers
People from Tavas
Süper Lig players
Giresunspor footballers
Association football defenders